Baum–Shaeffer Farm is a historic home and farm located in Deer Creek Township, Carroll County, Indiana. The house was built about 1855, and is a two-story, cross-plan, Italianate style brick dwelling.  It sits on a rubble limestone foundation and measures 40 feet wide and 60 feet long.  Also on the property are the contributing wooden hay barn (c. 1850), wooden granary (c. 1900), log smokehouse (1830s), brick summer kitchen (c. 1850), and wooden sheep barn (c. 1900).

It was listed on the National Register of Historic Places in 1998.

References

Farms on the National Register of Historic Places in Indiana
Italianate architecture in Indiana
Houses completed in 1855
Houses in Carroll County, Indiana
National Register of Historic Places in Carroll County, Indiana